Lieutenant John Steel "Jock" Lewes (21 December 1913 – 30 December 1941) was a British Army officer prominent during the Second World War. He was the founding principal training officer of the Special Air Service. Its founding commander, David Stirling, said later of Lewes: "Jock could far more genuinely claim to be founder of the SAS than I." Lewes also invented an explosive device for the purposes of the SAS, the eponymous Lewes bomb.

Early life, family and education

Lewes was born in Calcutta to a British father, chartered accountant Arthur Harold Lewes, and an Australian mother, Elsie Steel Lewes. The family moved to Australia and Lewes grew up at Bowral, New South Wales. As a teenager he attended The King's School, Parramatta.

Lewes travelled to the United Kingdom to attend Christ Church, Oxford, from September 1933. At Oxford he read philosophy, politics and economics. In 1936–37, Lewes was president of the Oxford University Boat Club; during 1937 he voluntarily gave up his place in the Oxford Blue boat crew, to assist it in winning that year's University Boat Race, and ending a 15-year winning streak by Cambridge. Lewes travelled to Berlin to work for the British Council and, before the events of Kristallnacht, was briefly an admirer of Hitler and the Nazi state.

A younger brother, David Steel Lewes, was later prominent as a cardiologist in the United Kingdom and served as a Royal Air Force medical officer during the war.
 
At the time of his death, Jock Lewes was engaged to marry Mirren Barford, an Oxford undergraduate. Their love letters were collected and published by Barford's son in 1995.

He was depicted by Alfie Allen in the 2022 television historical drama SAS: Rogue Heroes.

Military career
Lewes was first commissioned to the British Army's General List as a university candidate on 5 July 1935, while a student at Oxford. At the outbreak of the Second World War, he was briefly transferred to a Territorial Army unit, the 1st Battalion, Tower Hamlets Rifles, Rifle Brigade on 2 September 1939 before joining the Welsh Guards on 28 October.

In 1941, Lewes was in a group of volunteers assembled by David Stirling to form a unit dedicated to raiding missions against the lines of communication of Axis forces in North Africa. For military deception and counterespionage purposes, this platoon-sized group was at first officially known as "L" Detachment, Special Air Service Brigade.

To destroy Axis vehicles, members of the SAS surreptitiously attached small explosive charges. Lewes noticed the respective weaknesses of conventional (blast) and incendiaries, as well as their failure to destroy vehicles in some cases. He improvised a new, combined charge out of plastic explosive, diesel and thermite. The Lewes bomb was used throughout the Second World War.

In late December 1941, Lewes was involved in an SAS/LRDG raid on Axis airfields in Libya. As the raiders returned to Allied lines, their vehicles were repeatedly attacked by Italian and German aircraft. While returning fire on 30 December, near "Marble Arch" (El Gaus; Arco dei Fileni), Lewes was reportedly hit in the thigh by a 20 mm cannon round and died at the scene of the attack. He is commemorated on the Alamein Memorial.

Notes

References
Cowles, Virginia. The Phantom Major.
Wise, Michael, ed. Joy Street: A Wartime Romance in Letters.

External links
British Army Officers 1939–1945

1913 births
1941 deaths
Alumni of Christ Church, Oxford
Welsh Guards officers
Rifle Brigade officers
Special Air Service officers
British Army personnel killed in World War II
British people of Australian descent
Oxford University Boat Club rowers
Australian people of British descent
People educated at The King's School, Parramatta
People of the British Council
Deaths by airstrike during World War II
Military personnel from Kolkata
British Army officers
Military personnel of British India